The Pattern of Painful Adventures is a 90-minute 2008 radio play by Stephen Wakelam on the circumstances surrounding the writing of the play Pericles, Prince of Tyre by William Shakespeare and the sickness of his brother Edmund's child, introduced by a flashback by his daughter Susannah, playwright John Marston and William's secretary Robinson. It links the play to the marriage of Susannah and the birth of her daughter and to the similar themes of daughters, forests, storms, shipwrecks and lost infants from As You Like It, The Winter's Tale, and The Tempest. It is named after The Pattern of Painful Adventures, a main source for Pericles. It was first broadcast on BBC Radio 3 at 8pm on 23 November 2008, directed and produced by Jeremy Mortimer, and was followed in the same slot on 30 November by a repeat of a 2005 radio production of Pericles, with Tom Mannion as Pericles and Benjamin Zephaniah as Gower.

Cast 

 William Shakespeare - Antony Sher
 Jack Robinson - Will Keen
 John Marston - Stephen Critchlow
 George Wilkins - Chris Pavlo
 Susannah Shakespeare - Helen Longworth
 Richard Burbage - John Rowe
 William Ostler / Robert Johnson - Robert Lonsdale
 Edmund Shakespeare - Joseph Kloska

External links 

 BBC Radio 3

2008 plays
Cultural depictions of William Shakespeare
2008 audio plays
English plays
Plays based on real people